Jen Neale is a Canadian writer, whose debut novel Land Mammals and Sea Creatures was a shortlisted finalist for the Rogers Writers' Trust Fiction Prize in 2018.

An MFA graduate of the creative writing program at the University of British Columbia, she previously won the RBC Bronwen Wallace Award for Emerging Writers in 2012 for her short story "Elk-Headed Man".

References

External links

Living people
21st-century Canadian novelists
21st-century Canadian short story writers
21st-century Canadian women writers
Canadian women novelists
Canadian women short story writers
Writers from Vancouver
University of British Columbia alumni
Year of birth missing (living people)